The Vuelta Ciclista a El Salvador (English: Tour of El Salvador) is a multi-day road bicycle racing stage race held annually in late April and early May in El Salvador.  The Vuelta a El Salvador carries a UCI rating of 2.2 and is part of the UCI America Tour, which is one of six UCI Continental Circuits sponsored by the Union Cycliste Internationale, the sport's international governing body.

Men’s race Past winners

Women’s Race Past Winners

Jersey classifications
As of the 2014 edition of the race, the following jerseys were awarded:
 General classification: the rider with the lowest overall accumulated time
 Points classification: the rider who has scored the highest number of points
 Sprints classification: the rider who has scored the highest number of points from intermediate sprints
 Mountains classification: the rider who has scored the highest number of points from specified climbs
 Combativity classification: the rider who has been the most aggressive
 Young rider classification: the rider with the lowest overall accumulated time under a specified age
 Best Salvadorean rider: the rider with the lowest overall accumulated time from El Salvador
Source

References

External links

 
Cycle races in El Salvador
UCI America Tour races
Recurring sporting events established in 1964
1964 establishments in El Salvador
Women's road bicycle races